Dwight Thoburn Ream (March 23, 1892 – November 20, 1954) was an American football and basketball coach and college athletics administrator. 
He was the 16th head football coach at Washburn University in Topeka, Kansas, serving for two seasons, from 1920 to 1921, and compiling a record of 8–7–4.  In the 1920 game against Kansas Normal under coach Homer Woodson Hargiss, Kansas Normal fullback Jack Reeves sustained a neck injury that resulted in his death.  Ream was also the head basketball coach at Washburn in 1921–22, tallying a mark of 8–9.

Ream died after a long illness (heart ailment) in 1954.

Head coaching record

Football

References

External links
 

1892 births
1954 deaths
Basketball coaches from Kansas
Washburn Ichabods athletic directors
Washburn Ichabods football coaches
Washburn Ichabods men's basketball coaches
Sportspeople from Topeka, Kansas